Inose (written: 猪瀬) is a Japanese surname. Notable people with the surname include:

, Japanese electrical engineer
, Japanese footballer
, Japanese journalist, historian, social critic and biographer
, Japanese visual artist

Japanese-language surnames